Volker Press (March 28, 1939 in Erding/Oberbayern – October 15, 1993 in Tübingen) was a German historian.

Life and career
Volker Press studied history and English from 1957 to 1965 at the University of Munich. He completed his doctorate in 1966 with Friedrich Hermann Schubert with a dissertation on the Electorate of the Palatinate in the confessional age. After serving as an assistant at the University of Kiel and the University of Frankfurt, he took a post as a full professor (Professor ordinarius) of modern history at the University of Giessen. In 1980 he moved to a post at the University of Tübingen where he taught medieval and modern history until his sudden death in 1993.

The focal points of Press's research included the imperial knights, the ecclesiastical territories seized by the imperial nobles, and the position of the Habsburg emperors in the Holy Roman Empire and in their home territories. His papers are in the possession of the archive of the University of Tübingen. His voluminous library was acquired by the Charles University in Prague. Press had been a member of the Heidelberg Academy of Sciences since 1991.

Works 
 Monographs
 Calvinismus und Territorialstaat: Regierung und Zentralbehörden der Kurpfalz 1559–1619. Stuttgart: Klett-Cotta, 1970.
 Das alte Reich: Ausgewählte Aufsätze. Stephanie Blankenhorn and Johannes Kunisc, eds. 2nd. edition, Berlin: 2000, .
 Kaiser Karl V., König Ferdinand und die Entstehung der Reichsritterschaft. Wiesbaden: Steiner, 1976. 
 Kriege und Krisen: Deutschland 1600–1715. Neue Deutsche Geschichte. Munich: C.H. Beck, 1991., .
 Südwestdeutsche Bischofsresidenzen ausserhalb der Kathedralstädte. Stuttgart: Kohlhammer, 1992.

Edited volumes
 Moraw, Peter and Volker Press, ed. Academia Gissensis: Beiträge zur älteren Giessener Universitätsgeschichte. Marburg, 1982, .
 Press, Volker, and Dieter Stievermann, ed. Altes Reich und Deutscher Bund: Kontinuität in der Diskontinuität. Munich: Oldenbourg, 1995. 
 Press, Volker, and Dieter Stievermann, ed. Martin Luther: Probleme seiner Zeit. Stuttgart: Klett-Cotta,  1986. .
 Press, Volker, ed. Alternativen zur Reichsverfassung in der frühen Neuzeit? Munich: Oldenbourg, 1995. .

Further reading 
 
 Peter Moraw, Volker Press. in Historische Zeitschrift vol. 259  (1994): 878–883.

External links 
 
 Contents of his papers at the Universitätsarchiv Tübingen

Reformation historians
Academic staff of the University of Tübingen
Academic staff of the University of Giessen
1939 births
1993 deaths
20th-century German historians
German male non-fiction writers
People from Erding